The commune of Cendajuru is a commune of Cankuzo Province in north-eastern Burundi. The capital lies at Cendajuru.

References

Communes of Burundi
Cankuzo Province